St Martin de Porres School (SMDP) is private co-educational school in Dansoman in the Greater Accra Region of Ghana.

History
The school was founded in 1973 by Florence Laast.

Curriculum 
It offers the basic curriculum as prescribed by the Ghana Educational Service (GES).

Facilities 
In addition to classrooms, the school has a fully equipped information and communications technology lab, science laboratory, library and basketball court, and a good AstroTurf pitch.

See also

 Education in Ghana
 List of schools in Ghana

External links
 , the school's official website

1970s establishments in Ghana
1973 establishments in Africa
Educational institutions established in 1973
Greater Accra Region
Private schools in Africa
Schools in Ghana